The 24th Iowa Infantry Regiment was an infantry regiment that served in the Union Army during the American Civil War.

Service
The 24th Iowa Infantry was organized at Muscatine, Iowa and mustered in for three years of Federal service  on September 18, 1862.

The regiment was mustered out on July 17, 1865.

History
Soon after the receipt of the President's Proclamation of July 2, 1862, calling for three hundred thousand volunteers, Governor Kirkwood issued a commission to Eber C. Byam, of Linn County, authorizing him to raise a regiment to be called "The Iowa Temperance Regiment." Circulars were accordingly distributed by Byam through Linn and the adjoining counties. In a very short time more than double the requisite number of companies were organized and ready to march to the appointed rendezvous. They were composed of men of temperance principles and temperance habits—that is to say, of men who touched not, taste not, handle not spirituous or malt liquor, wine or cider. If the men have since adopted other principles or other habits, it has only been at such times as they were under the overruling power of military necessity. Out of the companies reported as ready to join the regiment, choice was made as follows: three from Linn County, F,G, and H, under Captains Dimmitt, Vinson, and Carbee; two from Cedar, B and C, Captains Rathburn and Johnson; two from Jackson, A and I, Captains Henderson and Martin; Company D from Johnson, Captain Casbeer; Company E from Tama, Captain Clark; and Company K from Jones, Captain Williams. E.C. Byam was duly commissioned colonel; John Q. Wilds, lieutenant-colonel; and Ed Wright, major.

The rendezvous of the companies was at Camp Strong, near the city of Muscatine, where the Thirty-fifth was also rendezvousing at the same time. After medical inspection of the Twenty-fourth, some of the companies were more than full. Those making the excess were transferred to the Thirty-fifth. On the 18th of September the regiment was mustered into the service of the United States, and was henceforward officially known as the Twenty-fourth Iowa Infantry, though it was long called by the public and by the newspaper correspondents the Temperance Regiment. The command remained at Camp Strong more than a month after the muster in, having a great deal of fun, drill, parade, and bad water, and a good deal of measles in camp. Marching orders came on October 19, and on the next day the regiment embarked for St. Louis. On reaching that city, orders were received commanding the regiment to proceed forthwith to Helena. It reached that place on the 28th, disembarked, and went into camp about one mile south of town on the bank of the Mississippi River. In this its first encampment on the theatre of war the Twenty-fourth numbered nine hundred and fifty, officers and men, who at the time of landing were nearly all in apparent good health. In a short time, however, on account of exposure during the late voyage, the steamers having been much crowded, and of the unhealthy locality, more than an hundred were on sick-list.

During the winter the regiment remained at Helena, except during three or four short periods in which it marched with certain expeditions, one or two of which had a military purpose in view, the others having no purpose whatever that has ever yet been discovered. This was the era when so many general officers had "expedition on the brain." On the 17th of November, Brigadier-General A.P. Hovey took some transports, and made an expedition. He took his command to the mouth of the White River, and then back again, without having disembarked or seen an enemy. The Twenty-fourth was with him. The regiment, on the 28th, marched under the same general, in the direction of Cold Water, Mississippi. The command now had its first experience in marching, and found no difficulty in keeping up with veteran troops. Arrived at Cold Water, the brigade in which was our regiment halted, while another with a small force of cavalry, advanced to Oakland, some twenty miles further. On the afternoon of December 1, artillery firing was heard in the direction of Oakland—the first sound of actual battle that had yet reached the ears of the Twenty-fourth. The brigade at Cold Water was at once formed, and soon moved to the front on the double-quick. Having thus marched several miles, they heard the retreat of the enemy, and themselves about-faced, and returned to Cold Water. They reached Helena again on the 7th of December. On the morning of January 11, 1863, our regiment embarked with the troops who endured so much suffering during General Gorman's White River Expedition, of which I shall relate many particulars in my account of the Twenty-eighth regiment. Suffice it here, that the sufferings of all the regiments which went on this unfortunate and unprofitable expedition were well nigh unendurable, and left marks in each organization which have never been effaced.

When the regiment reached Helena on its return, the old encampment had to be abandoned on account of the rising waters. A new camp was made on the first range of hills in rear of the town and about a mile distant. Helena was soon inundated. It became a miserable burlesque of Venice. The citizens could go from house to house only in canoes or skiffs, which were constantly plying from place to place. All the streets and alleys were navigable. The government transports bringing supplies could with the greatest difficulty find places where the stores could be landed. Water, water everywhere. When the floods subsided, deep unfathomable mud took the place of the waters. Sign-boards were everywhere stuck on poles, telling the unlucky teamsters of "No Bottom." It is impossible there can be a place in the world so uninteresting, in the very air of which there are so many blue devils, as Helena in Arkansas. During this rainy winter the troops there quartered were unspeakably miserable. It was the darkest period of the war for them all. There could be no drills, no dress parades. The troops who were well enough to sit up at all sat in their cheerless quarters, ruminating on their own unhappiness, barely noting the drum-beat for the dead, beating evermore. General Fisk, commanding brigade, was so good a man and officer, so thoroughly appreciative of the situation, that he accomplished what mortal could accomplish toward driving off the clouds of despondency settling on the army. The expedition under General Washburne, which left Helena on February 15, to open the Yazoo Pass to navigation aroused the army from its lethargy. It gave the troops who performed that heavy labor, change, which they greatly needed, and it gave all, hopes of active movements in the field. Of this expedition, General Fisk's brigade formed a part. From its return till the commencement of the campaign against Vicksburg, our regiment had daily drill, and almost daily dress parade. The command under the skillful and experienced instructions of Lieutenant-Colonel Wilds rapidly improved, and by the time the operations under General Grant commenced, was distinguished for its efficiency and discipline.

When the army was reorganized for the active operations of spring, the Twenty-fourth was attached to the Thirteenth Corps. It was known to all that the taking of Vicksburg was to be the object of the campaign, and all looked forward to the hour of departure with joy. Nevertheless, when the troops moved, their hearts were filled with deep and solemn feelings. Not one but had a brother or a favorite comrade sleeping the last sleep on the bluffs above or in the vale by the river's bank below. The Twenty-fourth had, I suppose, suffered neither less nor more than the other regiments. During the first three months of the year fifty of its members were buried near Helena. More were sent to the hospitals of Memphis, Cairo, and St. Louis. When the fleet was ready to sail on the 11th of April, the regiment could muster but little more than six hundred, rank and file.

The world knows how active was the grand campaign actually begun by the disembarking of the army at Milliken's Bend on the 14th of April, till after the assault of the 22d of May, and how hard were the duties of the investing army till the campaign was crowned with complete success on the 4th of July. The march, in Louisiana, from the point of debarking to a place named Perkins’ Landing, was made difficult and laborious by reason of the high waters. Bridges had to be built, corduroy roads made for the passage of trains. Here the army embarked on transports and barges, and proceeded on its way down the river to a point about four miles above Grand Gulf, and which is well named Hard Times, it having the appearance of being able to maintain a very poor family in a very poor way during a favorable season. Here the army, without disembarking, witnessed the cannonading between the gun-boats and the rebel batteries at Grand Gulf. The batteries could not all be silenced. The army accordingly disembarked, marched across the levee below Grand Gulf, where the transports reached them, having run the batteries successfully. The Battle of Port Gibson, or Thompson's Hill as it is sometimes called, and with more geographical accuracy, was fought and won very soon after the Thirteenth Corps landed at Bruinsburg, Mississippi. In this engagement, the Twenty-fourth was almost all the time supporting artillery. Its loss was slight—six wounded, one mortally.

From this time until the Battle of Champion Hills, our regiment did much marching, skirmishing, and foraging, but was not engaged at Raymond or at Jackson. On the 2d of May, the column marched into the beautiful town of Port Gibson, and bivouacked in the streets. The beauty and fashion of this place had made great preparations for a grand ball in honor of the victory over our fleet at Grand Gulf. The Battle of Port Gibson had altogether changed the programme. Many of our troops partook of the viands which had been prepared for guests of another sort. Here the column halted three days. The country roundabout Port Gibson is one of the richest cotton-growing regions of Mississippi. The white inhabitants were wealthy, cultivated after the Southern fashion, and aristocratic according to Southern notions. The war had hitherto not been carried into their door-yards. Their dwellings were magnificent mansions. They had fine carriages and blooded horses. Many of them had blooded negroes, too, for coachmen. They fared sumptuously every day. Thus were they living till our troops landed, when the most of the wealthy planters suddenly decamped. Our foraging parties met with all the embarrassment of riches. They would return, loaded down with supplies—beef, bacon, pork, poultry, vegetables. One might see gorgeous family carriages coming into Port Gibson from all directions, filled with geese, ducks, and chickens, or coming from the mills, laden with great bags of meal. Yet no man's property was destroyed, or even taken for the use of the army, without there being first obtained evidence of his disloyalty to the Union, which evidence very often consisted of the fact that he had run away from the Union army. No houses were burned, no cotton was destroyed. The Union troops simply did what the planters had done before them. They fared sumptuously every day. Having remained here long enough to get together a large quantity of supplies, the column moved on the 6th to Rocky Springs. On the next day, it moved to Big Sandy Creek, and was there reviewed by General Grant. On the 10th it moved still farther northward, halting near Cayuga. Here the grand army first came together, and marched forward in an unbroken line of several miles extent, making a grand sight. McClernand's Corps was on the left. On the morning of the 12th, his advance Division, being that of General Hovey, to which the Twenty-fourth belonged, moved to Fourteen Mile Creek, in the direction of Edwards’ Depot. Here he had a sharp skirmish with the enemy, and deployed his men in line of battle. The main rebel army from Vicksburg, twenty-five thousand strong, as reported, was drawn up two or three miles in advance. Meantime, while Hovey was here amusing the enemy, McPherson whipped the rebel force at Raymond. Hovey then withdrew, and taking a new road just made by his pioneers, passed through Raymond on the day after the battle, and reached Clinton on the 14th. On the next morning the Thirteenth Corps turned about, and marching westward, reached Bolton Depot in the evening.

In the battle of Champion Hills, fought on the 16th, and which was the most severe engagement of the campaign except the assault of Vicksburg itself, Hovey's Division bore the brunt of the contest for hours, fighting with a valor and obstinacy which conferred eternal honor upon the troops. The Twenty-fourth Iowa was second to no regiment in the splendid fighting on this bloody field. Not an officer or a man engaged but did his duty meritoriously, yes with special gallantry. At one time in the fight the regiment advanced, unsupported, to charge a battery of five guns whose grape and canister were rapidly thinning the Union ranks. The Twenty-fourth rushed to the charge with the greatest enthusiasm, trampled down the gunners, and by their own momentum the men pressed far beyond the battery, driving the infantry supports away in wild confusion. But they were in turn attacked by overwhelming numbers, and compelled to give way. It was in this daring charge that Major Wright was severely wounded. Here were slain Captains Silas D. Johnson and William Carbee, and Lieutenant Chauncey Lawrance-gallant officers as ever lived of died in the cause of American nationality and of man. The loss of the regiment was severe. Forty-three officers and men were slain, forty more were borne with mortal wounds from the field to the grave, nearly thirty were maimed for life, and the whole loss, killed, wounded and captured, out of the four hundred and seventeen who entered the fight as one hundred and ninety-five. Such was the great sacrifice of the Temperance Regiment on the glorious field of Champion Hills. 3

The Regiment, with the division to which it belonged, did not join in the rapid pursuit of the enemy which followed the great victory, and did not take part, consequently in the Battle of Black River Bridge, the next day, where the Twenty-first and Twenty-third Iowa regiments won the first honors and suffered the saddest losses. It joined the beleaguering army soon, however, and bore its full share in the siege of the rebel stronghold. When Vicksburg surrendered, there were few regiments in all the army which had accomplished more, or suffered more, in bringing about the great victory the Twenty-fourth.

But it was not yet to have rest, for at once joining General Sherman's expeditionary army, it took part in the campaign of Jackson—a campaign of great labors and of great results, but without a general battle. having been driven far to the eastward, and central Mississippi laid waste, the army under Sherman Returned to the vicinity of Vicksburg, and most of the troops which had been instrumental in the reduction of that place were granted rest. But the thirteenth Corps, now commanded by General Ord, was transferred to the department of the Gulf, having had only about a fortnight's repose after the Jackson campaign.

The history of the Twenty-fourth in this department until it joined the army on the Red River Expedition was devoid of memorable events. It took part, in the fall and early winter of 1863, in one or two expeditions, but though the troops marched much, labored much, and sometimes met the enemy in small forces, their marches, laborers, and skirmishes, were barren of results.

The first of the year 1864 found the regiment encamped at Algiers, weather very wet, the mud and water rendering the camp almost impassable to man or beast. Recollections of Helena came forcibly to the men's minds, but the 14th of January, quarters were obtained in warehouses. The 21st, the command moved, and the next day encamped near the northern shore of Lake Pontchartrain, By Madisonville. This was the most pleasant camp the regiment ever had, after leaving Camp Strong, near Muscatine. It was evacuated on the evening of February 26. The regiment was reviewed by General McClernand at Algiers on the 3d of March, and received the special commendations of that officer.

From Algiers the Twenty-fourth moved by rail to Berwick Bay, and Thence on the 13th joined the Red River Expedition under General Banks. The 1st of April, the command reached Natchitoches, after a march of nearly three hundred miles from Berwick Bay. Here it remained in camp till the morning of the 6th, when the army resumed the march for Shreveport. Encamped near Pleasant Hill on the evening of the 7th. On the next day was fought

Battles

The Battle of Sabine Cross Roads
It was the intention of General Banks, when his forces moved from Grand Ecore on the morning of the 6th, that the advance should reach Springfield Landing on the 10th, and there effect a junction with Admiral Porter preparatory to the final combined movement against Shreveport. His army moved in unique fashion. The cavalry had the advance. It was followed by prodigious trains, enough, one might suppose, to have formed the impedimenta of the army of Xerxes. The Thirteenth Corps came next after this prodigious train, but marching in disjointed manner, one division far in advance of the other. The Nineteenth Corps was several miles in rear. Now when it is considered that the roads in this part of Louisiana are narrow and bad, that the country is covered with a dense pine timber, rendering military operations on a large scale impracticable, except in a few localities, and cavalry absolutely useless, it might seem that common prudence should have dictated the most careful compression of the line of march, the utmost caution against surprise, the greatest care in the selection of a position on which to deliver battle, and constant vigilance in keeping the troops in hand. On the contrary, the enemy having hitherto offered the merest show of resistance to our advance, it is not too much to say that General Banks had his army all the while in air. Thus his troops were moving recklessly, blindfold, as it were, when on the afternoon of the 8th, at Sabine Cross Roads, near Mansfield, the mounted advance came upon the enemy in force, and, fighting on foot, was soon defeated. The enemy's line overlapped ours on both flanks. Embarrassed by their horses, astonished at the unexpected fury of an enemy whose heels only they expected to see, the cavalry melted away, and speedily became a rout of shrieking men on frightened horses. The Thirteenth Corps was hurried into action division at a time, but though each fought gallantly to stem the tide of defeat, each was compelled to give way. The troops fell back in confusion. The enemy pursued, and, flushed with victory, fell upon the Nineteenth Corps, in the very act of deploying into line of battle, but met with the first check of the day. But he was not repulsed, and the whole army was soon in retreat, having lost two thousand, killed, wounded, and prisoners, several batteries of artillery, and large quantities of property.

Such was the disastrous battle of Sabine Cross Roads, in which the troops engaged fought with great valor, but which was lost to the Union arms by reason of unskilful generalship on the part of the commanding officer, and by that alone. Few troops ever fought more bravely than those who were compelled to pass under the yoke of this defeat, and it is impossible that any could ever have been handled worse. The defeat, therefore, brought unmixed disgrace upon General Banks, but no discredit to his troops generally.

Only half of the Twenty-fourth regiment took part in this engagement, five of the companies on guard duty with the train in the rear. To get into the fight, the command was marched several miles on the double-quick, and then pushed into battle with the division, after the other division of the corps had been thoroughly defeated. The regiment fought for more than an hour, and then gave way with the division. Major Wright commanding says his officers and men behaved handsomely, standing firmly at their posts until ordered to retreat. The regiment lost thirty-four, wounded and captured. Captain Wilbur C. Dimmitt, a brave officer and accomplished gentleman, was severely wounded. He fell into the hands of the enemy, and not long afterwards died.

General Ransom, an intrepid commander, beloved by his troops as General McPherson was by his, was wounded at Sabine Cross Roads. The detachment of the Thirteenth Corps—Third and Fourth Divisions—which he commanded on this expedition took charge of the train after the battle, moving in guard thereof to Grand Ecore. In the retreat from Grand Ecore, the Twenty-fourth frequently met the enemy in skirmish, and lost several men wounded. After the army reached Morganza on the 22d of May, the regiment joined in a reconnaissance to the Atchafalaya, during which Captain B.G. Paul was slain and a number of men wounded. Lieutenant-Colonel Wilds had rejoined the regiment at Alexandria, after a considerable absence in Iowa on recruiting service.

About the middle of June the command left Morganza, and having encamped at Greenville, near New Orleans, a few days, and at Kennerville a few days more, hastened to Thibodeaux in the latter part of the month to repel an enemy who turned out to be imaginary. Having stayed here a few days the regiment returned to Algiers, whence on the 22d of July, it commenced the voyage by river, gulf, and ocean to Alexandria, in Virginia, arriving on the evening of the 30th. Passed through Washington the next day, and moved right on by cars to Mopnocacy, Maryland. Soon afterwards, it moved to Harper's Ferry, and joined the forces under General Sheridan, to take part in that officer's campaign of the Shenandoah Valley.

The first great engagement of the campaign was the battle of Winchester. In this long and severe contest the Twenty-fourth, as we have seen in the history of the Twenty-second regiment, fought with prominent gallantry, and lost many of its officers and men. Captain Joseph R. Gould and Lieutenant Sylvester S. Dillman were slain while leading their men in the hottest of the fight; Adjutant Daniel W. Camp, Lieutenants W.W. Edgington, and Royal S. Williams were wounded. The entire loss of the regiment was seventy-four, killed, wounded, and captured, there being only three captured. Leaving the killed to be buried, and the wounded cared for by the proper details of men, the regiment pushed on up the valley with the army.

The Battle of Fisher’s Hill
Immediately after the battle of Winchester, Early withdrew to Fisher's Hill, a strong position just beyond Strasburg, and commanding the town. Here he made a stand, his right resting on the base of Massanutten Mountain, his left on the Little North Mountain, his line thus extending across the Strasburg Valley. Notwithstanding the strength of the rebel position, General Sheridan determined to deliver battle. His army was in position early on Thursday morning, the 22d, Crook's Eighth Corps, the Army of Western Virginia on the right, the Sixth Corps in the centre, the Nineteenth Corps on the left. There was considerable maneuvering until after noon. Emory demonstrated on the left, Ricketts’ Division of the Sixth Corps advanced directly in front, and Averill's Cavalry drove in the enemy's pickets. Under cover of these demonstrations Crook moved out to the extreme right, and by an arduous march gained the enemy's left and rear, and, charging with splendid impetuosity, drove him from his intrenchments in utter confusion. Wright and Emory at the same time moved against the enemy, who fled in disorder and rout before the dashing attacks of the whole Union army. It was a short fight, and a magnificent victory. Nearly twelve hundred prisoners of war, sixteen cannon, and immense spoils besides fell into our hands. The loss of the rebels was also great in killed and wounded, whilst that of the Unionists did not probably exceed five hundred, all told. The enemy's fire was wild. He was thrown into panic by the suddenness with which Sheridan dashed against him with his whole force. And hence the troops, looking at their small losses, not thinking that they won the battle by their legs and their enthusiasm, did not regard it as so great a victory as that of Winchester, which preceded, of that of Cedar Creek, which followed it. In sober truth, there were but few so great victories during the war, gained with such little cost of life and blood.

In this engagement, the Twenty-fourth took active part, but as it lost only five wounded, it was a matter of doubt for some time whether its operations should be reported! So apt are even the most skillful and gallant officers to associate great victories with great losses, instead of results.

The regiment moved from its position in the line to the extreme left, passing with almost miraculous safety, through a shower of shells. It went into position, in support of a Maine battery, and there remained under fire, but covered much by the nature of the ground, till Sheridan's signal ordered the charge along the whole line, When it dashed forward with yells that made the welkin ring.

The quick, decisive battle over, the regiment at once took up the pursuit, and marching the livelong night close to the enemy's rear, reached Woodstock early on the morning of the 23d. During this march Captain McKinley was severely, and several men were slightly, wounded by the enemy's fire.  Pursuing as far as Harrisburg the regiment went into camp.

Countermarching with the army it took position on the line of the Cedar Creek, which was soon well fortified on the left and centre. Early having been heavily reinforced, turned this position on the morning of the 19th of October, and came near ruining our army be a similar plan to that of Sheridan against him on the field of Winchester. Sheridan was at the time at Winchester, on his return from Washington. His wild ride to the field of battle, and his saving the day, can never be forgotten, for they have been made immortal by the genius of T. BUCHANAN READ, whose thrilling poem upon this subject is the most soul-searching lyric of the war. In this last and crowning victory of the campaign, the Twenty-Fourth bore a brilliant part, losing here its commanding officer, mortally wounded, and many others in death and wounds. Nearly an hundred of its officers and men were placed hors-de-combat on this bloody field, on which no regiment in all the Union army fought more heroically, or more steadfastly than the Iowa Twenty-fourth. The same may be safely said, too, of its conduct at Winchester and Fisher's Hill. During the campaign its losses were nearly two hundred, officers and men.

With the battle of Cedar Creek, the campaign of the Shenandoah Valley was brought to an end. Our regiment did not afterwards meet the enemy. It performed heavy escort duty for a time, marching and countermarching between Cedar Creek and Martinsburg, and I the latter part of November went into cold, airy encampment on the Opequan. The men constructed huts, however, and got to be quite cozy, but near the close of the month the command was ordered to Winchester, where it remained on post duty till ordered south in the early part of January, 1865. At this time the officers of the regiment were: Lieutenant-Colonel Ed. Wright; Major, Leander Clark; Adjutant, William H. Smouse; Surgeon, Doctor Henry M. Lyons, with S.S. Cook, J.M. Lanning, assistants; Quartermaster, A.B. Eshelman. Company A—Captain Seymour J. McKinley; Lieutenants Charles E. Davis, William B. Davis. Company B—Captain William T. Rigby; Lieutenants William Kelly, W.W. Edgington. Company C—Captain Edwin H. Pound; Lieutenants A.J. Scott, Andrew Pierce. Company D—Captain Charles A. Lucas; Lieutenants J.B. Swafford, D.W. Ott. Company E—Captain James Rokes; Lieutenant William T. Holmes. Company F—Captain C.B. Bradshaw; Lieutenant Thaddeus L. Smith. Company G—Captain William W. Smith; Lieutenant j.m. Hord. Company H—Captain A.R. Knott; Lieutenants F.R. Jones, A.R. Hodgkins. Company I—Captain James W. Martin; Lieutenant J.W. McMichael. Company K—Captain Aaron W. Loomis; Lieutenants Royal S. Williams, James L. Hall.

The 6th of January, 1865, the Twenty-fourth bade farewell to the Shenandoah Valley. Moving by cars to Baltimore, the regiment was there quartered in stables!--an insult which could have been nowhere else offered to troops who had proudly borne the colors of the Union at Port Gibson, Champion Hills, Vicksburg, Jackson, Sabine Cross Roads, Winchester, Fisher's Hill, and Cedar Creek. Thence the regiment moved by steamship to Savannah, Georgia, where it had quiet for some two months. It then moved to Morehead City, North Carolina, in which State it performed heavy duties for some time, helping on the transportation between Goldsboro and Raleigh. After the capitulation of Johnston it returned to Savannah, and thence made the same movement to Augusta and back, which has been noted in the history of the Twenty-second regiment. It was mustered out of service at Savannah, and from there moved to Iowa, and was finally disbanded in the early part of August.

Summary
The Twenty-fourth Iowa Infantry, sometimes called our "Temperance," sometimes our "Methodist" regiment was among the most distinguished of our Iowa commands. Colonel Byam, a clergyman of the Methodist Episcopal Church, was compelled to leave the service by reason of ill health in the summer of 1863. Lieutenant-Colonel Wilds, who succeeded in the command, took faithful, conscientious charge of his troops, till he gave up his life in the cause of his country. Wright, the last commanding officer, was one of our most successful soldiers as he had been one of our most noted men in the walks of civil life. All the officers, and the men generally, were remarkable for their bravery, their powers of endurance, their moral rectitude. Not the stern soldiery which, under the inspiration of Hampden and the leadership of Cromwell overturned the monarchy of England, ever fought more bravely, or suffered more patiently, than the Twenty-fourth Iowa Volunteers. It is impossible that men should have ever gone to war out of a higher sense of duty than did those of this command; and it is to the praise of morality, of temperance, of Christianity, that throughout a long career of as gallant service as was ever performed, they were as brave as they were virtuous. No troops left the service with a cleaner record than did these Methodist Volunteers, when, the war ended, they laid aside the sword of the Lord and of Gideon.

Total strength and casualties
A total of 1204 men served in the 24th Iowa at one time or another during its existence.
It suffered 6 officers and 69 enlisted men who were killed in action or who died of their wounds and 1 officer and 208 enlisted men who died of disease, for a total of 284 fatalities.

Commanders
 Colonel Eber C. Byam
 Colonel John Q. Wilds
 Lieutenant Colonel Edward Wright

See also 
 List of Iowa Civil War Units
 Iowa in the American Civil War
 Samuel J. Kirkwood
 Siege of Vicksburg
 Battle of Big Black River Bridge

Notes

References 
 The Civil War Archive
 Civil War Soldiers & Sailors System
 History of Company H - The "Springville Company" of the Twenty-Fourth Iowa Volunteers by Stan E. Capron

Units and formations of the Union Army from Iowa
Military units and formations established in 1862
1862 establishments in Iowa
Military units and formations disestablished in 1865